Raúl Ramírez was the defending champion but lost in the first round to Victor Amaya.

Tony Roche won the singles title at the 1978 Queen's Club Championships tennis tournament defeating John McEnroe in the final 8–6, 9–7.

Seeds

  Raúl Ramírez (first round)
  Sandy Mayer (semifinals)
  Ilie Năstase (first round)
  John McEnroe (final)
  Tim Gullikson (first round)
  John Alexander (quarterfinals)
  John Newcombe (third round)
  Adriano Panatta (first round)
  Jaime Fillol (third round)
  Phil Dent (second round)
  John Lloyd (quarterfinals)
 n/a
  Hank Pfister (second round)
  Mark Cox (first round)
  Tom Leonard (first round)
  Jeff Borowiak (first round)

Draw

Finals

Top half

Section 1

Section 2

Bottom half

Section 3

Section 4

References

External links
Official website Queen's Club Championships 
ATP tournament profile

Singles